Sixteen players qualified for the women's singles event in the 2012 US Open tennis championship. They were selected from 128 entrants in a three-round knockout qualifying competition.

Seeds

Qualifiers

Lucky loser

Draw

First qualifier

Second qualifier

Third qualifier

Fourth qualifier

Fifth qualifier

Sixth qualifier

Seventh qualifier

Eighth qualifier

Ninth qualifier

Tenth qualifier

Eleventh qualifier

Twelfth qualifier

Thirteenth qualifier

Fourteenth qualifier

Fifteenth qualifier

Sixteenth qualifier

References 
 Women's Qualifying draw
2012 US Open – Women's draws and results at the International Tennis Federation

Women's Singles Qualifying
2012 US Open (tennis)
US Open (tennis) by year – Qualifying